Radford "Graham" Snelding VII (born December 11, 1972) is an American football coach.  Snelding was the head football coach at Haskell Indian Nations University in Lawrence, Kansas, serving for one season, in 2001, and compiling a record of 0–11.
Snelding is the current head football coach at Nowata High School in Nowata, Oklahoma. He was the head football coach of Fredrick High School in Frederick, Oklahoma. He was he the defensive coordinator for Teague High School in Teague, Texas in 2012 and the offensive coordinator for Ponca City High School in Ponca City, Oklahoma for the 2008 through the 2011 seasons and in 2017. He has also coached high school football at Pawhuska, Oklahoma, Marietta, Oklahoma, Clarksville, Texas and Perry, Florida.

References

1972 births
Living people
Haskell Indian Nations Fighting Indians football coaches
High school football coaches in Florida
High school football coaches in Oklahoma
High school football coaches in Texas
Haskell Indian Nations University alumni
Northwestern Oklahoma State University alumni
University of Kansas alumni